Werner Freitag (born 4 January 1946) is a German former butterfly swimmer who won the national 200 m title in 1963 and 1965. He competed in the 200 m event at the 1964 Summer Olympics and in the 100 m event the 1968 Summer Olympics, but failed to reach the finals. His daughter Meike also became an Olympic swimmer.

References

External links
 

1946 births
Living people
German male swimmers
Olympic swimmers of the United Team of Germany
Olympic swimmers of West Germany
Swimmers at the 1964 Summer Olympics
Swimmers at the 1968 Summer Olympics
Sportspeople from Lower Saxony
German male butterfly swimmers
20th-century German people
21st-century German people